Abimbola "Abi" Daré is a Nigerian author who now lives in Essex, England. In 2018 she won the Bath Novel Award, and was a finalist in the Literary Consultancy Pen Factor 2018. Her debut novel The Girl With The Louding Voice was published in 2020.

Biography 
Daré grew up in Lagos, Nigeria, attending the Vivian Fowler Memorial College for Girls, and moved to the UK for her higher education. Her mother Teju Somorin was the first female professor of taxation in Nigeria.

Daré has a degree in law from the University of Wolverhampton, a master's in international project management from Glasgow Caledonian University and a master's in creative writing from Birkbeck.

She has said she began writing fiction on a blog and was the editor of her church magazine. Daré works overseeing app development for a publishing firm.

Career

The Girl with the Louding Voice 
Daré's debut novel The Girl with the Louding Voice is a story about a teenage Nigerian girl called Adunni who becomes a maid and struggles with many things growing up, including her limited education, poverty and her ability to speak up for herself.

The book became a New York Times Bestseller and is a Read with Jenna choice and a BBC Radio 4 Book at Bedtime pick. Published by Sceptre, an imprint of Hodder, it was shortlisted for the Desmond Elliott Prize for first time novelists. Daré was included in The Observers list of 10 Best Debut Novelists of 2020.

References 

Nigerian emigrants to the United Kingdom
Nigerian novelists
Alumni of the University of Wolverhampton
Alumni of Glasgow Caledonian University
Alumni of Birkbeck, University of London
Year of birth missing (living people)
Living people
Writers from Lagos
Writers from Essex